"Girls & Boys" is a 1986 song by American musician Prince and The Revolution, from his eighth studio album, Parade (1986), the soundtrack to the film Under the Cherry Moon. The song was released as a single in the UK, and as the B-side to "Anotherloverholenyohead" in the US.

Following the smash success of its predecessor "Kiss", "Girls & Boys" peaked at number 11 in the UK, but was not released as a single in America. Prince's former drummer, Bobby Z. later commented that the song may have helped the entire album and film achieve bigger success, saying "second singles sometimes weren't right... 'Kiss' was a complete smash and set the album up huge. In my opinion it should then have been 'Girls & Boys', not 'Mountains'". The music video for the single consisted of clips from the film and separately-shot footage of The Revolution, including Prince's then-fiancee Susannah Melvoin.

"Girls & Boys" is a funk offering featuring both live drumming as well as the drum machine Linn LM-1.  The keyboard hook is a peculiar duck-like sound.  This is the first official Prince single to include the saxophone contributions of Eric Leeds. The lyrics speak of characters similar to Christopher and Mary from Under the Cherry Moon, although their actions are not seen in the film. The song includes a seduction spoken by Marie France in French, as well as an early attempt by Prince to deliver a short rap. Background vocals are Wendy & Lisa, and Susannah Melvoin. Sheila E. is not in it.

The B-side was the LP version of "Under the Cherry Moon". The 12" single also included the 1984 track "Erotic City", which originally backed "Let's Go Crazy". In addition, a special double 7" single was released containing "Girls & Boys", "She's Always in My Hair" (which originally backed "Paisley Park"), "Under the Cherry Moon", and "17 Days", which originally backed "When Doves Cry".

In March 2006, British actress Kristin Scott Thomas, one of the stars of Under the Cherry Moon, nominated "Girls and Boys" as one of her eight favourite Desert Island Discs.

"Girls and Boys" was covered by jazz/funk bassist Marcus Miller on his 2005 album Silver Rain, featuring singer Macy Gray.

Track listing
 7" vinyl / 7" vinyl picture disc
 "Girls & Boys (Edit)" – 3:27
 "Under The Cherry Moon" – 2:57

 2x7" vinyl
 "Girls & Boys (Edit)" – 3:27
 "Under The Cherry Moon" – 2:57
 "She's Always In My Hair" – 3:27
 "17 Days" – 3:52

 12" vinyl
 "Girls & Boys (LP Version)" – 5:30
 "Under The Cherry Moon" – 2:57
 "Erotic City (Make Love Not War Erotic City Come Alive)" – 7:24

Personnel

 Prince — lead vocals and various instruments
 Lisa Coleman — keyboards and backing vocals
 Wendy Melvoin — guitar and backing vocals
 Dr. Fink — keyboards
 Brown Mark — bass
 Bobby Z. — drums and percussion
 Sheila E. — backing vocals
 Eric Leeds — baritone saxophone
 Atlanta Bliss — trumpet

 Susannah Melvoin — backing vocals
 Marie-France Drouin — vocals in french 
 Clare Fischer — orchestral arrangements

Charts

Notes

1986 singles
Prince (musician) songs
Songs written by Prince (musician)
Music videos directed by Prince (musician)
Paisley Park Records singles
Warner Records singles
Song recordings produced by Prince (musician)
1986 songs
Songs written for films